Wat Sen, Luang Prabang also known as Wat Sene Souk Haram is a Buddhist temple (wat), located in Luang Phrabang, Laos.

History
It was built in 1718 by King Kitsarath with 100,000 stones from the Mekong river. It literally means "Temple of 100,000 treasures". It was restored in 1957 commemorating the Buddha's birth 2500 years earlier.

See also
Wat Xieng Thong
Royal Palace, Luang Prabang

Buddhist temples in Laos
Buildings and structures in Luang Prabang
Religious buildings and structures completed in 1718
18th-century Buddhist temples